Boris Shraiman is a theoretical physicist working on statistical physics and biology. He is a Permanent Member of the Kavli Institute for Theoretical Physics and the Susan F Gurley Professor of Theoretical Physics and Biology at the University of California, Santa Barbara.

Biography 
Shraiman earned a PhD from Harvard in 1983 and did postdoctoral work at the University of Chicago in the James Franck Institute. In his early work, Shraiman addressed how dynamical systems transition to chaos and how patterns form in viscous flows and dendritic growth. He moved to Bell Labs, where he worked on quantum materials, then later became a professor at Rutgers University in 2002 and the University of California, Santa Barbara in 2004. He has advanced the understanding of turbulent fluids, and since the 1990s, his work has built connections between statistical physics and biological problems. In particular, his research has pointed to the interplay between mechanics and morphogenesis, which addresses the problem of "growth and form" in animal development, and developed models to describe evolutionary dynamics in populations such as influenza.
He became a member of the National Academy of Sciences in 2011.

References

External links 

 www.nasonline.org/member-directory/members/20015876.html Boris I. Shraiman at NAS

Living people
University of California, Santa Barbara faculty
Rutgers University faculty
Harvard University alumni
1956 births